Jason Probst is an American politician. He is Democrat representing District 102 in the Kansas House of Representatives.

Political career 

In 2017, Jason Probst was selected to fill the District 102 seat in the Kansas House of Representatives, after the death of former representative Patsy Terrell. He was elected unopposed to a full term in 2018, and is running again in 2020.

As of June 2020, Probst sits on the following committees:
 Rural Revitalization (Ranking Minority Member)
 Commerce, Labor and Economic Development
 Agriculture
 2019 Special Committee on Natural Resources

References 

Democratic Party members of the Kansas House of Representatives
Living people
Year of birth missing (living people)
21st-century American politicians